James Cecil Higdon II (born July 15, 1953), known as Jimmy Higdon, is an American businessman from Lebanon, Kentucky, who has been a Republican member of the Kentucky State Senate since 2009. He represents District 14, which until August 23, 2013, included Marion, Mercer, Nelson, Taylor, and Washington counties in Central Kentucky.

Under redistricting legislation signed by Governor Steve Beshear, Taylor County, where Higdon was born, was immediately removed from Higdon's District 14 and placed in District 16, then represented by Republican Sara Beth Gregory of Monticello in Wayne County. Higdon now has a vastly revised district: Casey, Marion, Nelson, and Spencer counties as well as a portion of Jefferson County. In addition to Taylor County and her own Wayne County, Gregory represented Adair, Clinton, Cumberland, McCreary, and Russell counties. She lost the succeeding primary election to Max Wise of Campbellsville, now senator. The Kentucky Supreme Court struck down the 2012 districting on the grounds that it did not comply with the federal "one man, one vote" concept. Higdon said that he is "just really, really disappointed in the way that the plan worked out, as far as my losing Taylor County."

Background
The oldest of seven children of James Cecil and Alice Higdon, Jimmy Higdon was reared in Lebanon, Kentucky, where he graduated in 1971 from Marion County High School. In 1975, he earned his Bachelor of Science degree in industrial arts technology with a minor in business administration from Morehead State University in Morehead in Rowan County in northeastern Kentucky. Thereafter, he was commissioned a second lieutenant in the United States Army, trained at Fort Lee, in Prince George County near Petersburg, Virginia.

In 1976, Higdon returned to Lebanon to become a partner in Key Market, subsequently Higdon's Foodtown IGA, or Independent Grocers Alliance. On January 22, 2011, after three consecutive years of losses, Higdon's IGA closed. Higdon sold the business to Houchens Industries, based in Bowling Green, Kentucky. Houchens established a Save-A-Lot outlet at the former IGA location. Higdon compared independent grocers such as himself to "dinosaurs. There's a few less every." He continued to operate his Higdon's Appliance Service in Lebanon.

Higdon is a former board member of the Lebanon Housing Authority, the Kentucky Grocers Association, and the Marion County Chamber of Commerce. He is affiliated with Rotary International.

Higdon is married to the former Jane Miles, a native of Loretto, also in Marion County. The couple has two grown children, Brittany H. Nagle, and James Cecil Higdon, III, known as James Higdon on his byline.

Political career
On December 8, 2009, Higdon, then a state representative, won a special election for Senate District 14. He defeated Democrat Jodie Haydon of Bardstown, Nelson County. Haydon is also a former member of the Kentucky House. The vacancy in the upper chamber of the legislature occurred when Republican Senator Dan Kelly of Springfield in Washington County was appointed as a state district court judge by Democratic Governor Steve Beshear. Elected the next year to a full four-year term on November 2, 2010, Higdon's first full term in office expired on December 31, 2014. Beshear also appointed a second Republican senator, Charlie Borders of Russell in Greenup County in far northeastern Kentucky, to the Kentucky Public Service Commission, another state position with a generous retirement pension. In both cases, Beshear hoped to open two Republican Senate seats to possible Democratic victory but failed in that goal with Higdon's election. During his campaign Higdon opposed the generous pensions from which these senators benefit and vowed to try to repeal the higher pensions after he took office.

In 2002, with a 45 percent overall turnout of registered voters, Higdon narrowly won election for the first time to the Kentucky House from District 24 for the position vacated by Democrat William U. Scott. Higdon defeated Democrat Connie Sue Rakes, 5,911 (51.1 percent) to 5,657 (48.9 percent). Rakes had been unopposed for the Democratic nomination. He was reelected in 2004, 2006, and 2008. District 24 includes Marion, Casey, and a portion of Pulaski counties. When he was elevated to the Senate, voters early in 2010 chose a Democrat, Terry Mills, also from Lebanon, to succeed Higdon in the House. Mills defeated Republican Leo Johnson, 3,000 to 2,518 votes though Johnson had been an easy winner in his own Casey County.

In 2008 in his last election to the House for the term which he did not complete, Higdon was endorsed by the Kentucky Education Association. He is also a past recipient of the Joe Kelly Education Award from the Kentucky Department of Education and holds the "Friend of Education" designation from the Kentucky School Board Association.

A Roman Catholic, Higdon carries the endorsement of Kentucky Right to Life. A backer too of the Second Amendment, he has been endorsed by the National Rifle Association.

In 2012 Higdon introduced Senate Bill 158 to exempt Kentuckians from state laws that contradict an individual's religious beliefs unless there is an overriding reason why such laws should be enforced. A liberal blog called it "Higdon's Sharia law" though he had intended it to protect Christians from secularism.

In 2011, Senator Higdon called for tighter state regulations to prevent physicians from establishing temporary clinics from which they issue prescriptions to drug abusers. A "pain clinic" of this kind opened in Lebanon in 2010, but citizens complained of van-loads of people waiting in the parking lot to purchase prescriptions. As police began to investigate, the clinic abruptly closed; the doctor was since found with another such operation in Lexington, Kentucky. Many pain clinics are legal, but others have been questioned as "pill mills".

Higdon supports allowing independent voters to cast ballots in major party primary elections. His legislation to accomplish that goal passed the state Senate in 2011 but was blocked in the House. Higdon said that many independent voters have told him that they are "taxpayers, they help pay for elections, so they should be able to vote" even if these persons declare no party allegiance. Higdon said the first party that voluntarily opens up its primary process to independents could enjoy an unfair advantage in the general election over the other party.

Effective in 2013, Higdon assumed the chairmanship of the Senate Veterans, Military Affairs and Public Protection Committee. He is also chairman of the budget review subcommittee on transportation of the Senate Appropriations and Revenue Committee.

References

|-

|-

1953 births
21st-century American politicians
Businesspeople from Kentucky
Catholics from Kentucky
Republican Party Kentucky state senators
Living people
Republican Party members of the Kentucky House of Representatives
Morehead State University alumni
People from Lebanon, Kentucky
People from Taylor County, Kentucky
United States Army officers